Columbia is an unincorporated community located in the town of Hewett, Clark County, Wisconsin, United States.

History
A post office called Columbia was established in 1894, and remained in operation until it was discontinued in 1920. The community was named after the song "Hail, Columbia."

Notes

Unincorporated communities in Clark County, Wisconsin
Unincorporated communities in Wisconsin